Skipper (or Skippers) is a surname. Notable people with the surname include:

Dan Skipper (born 1994), American football player
Elix Skipper (born 1967), American professional wrestler and former professional football player
George Skipper (1856–1948), English architect
Harry Skipper (born 1960), Canadian football player
Howard E. Skipper (1915–2006), American cancer researcher and oncologist
John Skipper, president of ESPN
Jim Skipper (born 1949), American football coach
Kelly Skipper (born 1967), American football coach
Pat Skipper (born 1958), American actor
Peter Skipper (born 1958), English retired footballer
 Ricardo Skippers (born 1986), South African footballer
Ryan Skipper (1981–2007), American murder victim
Spencer Skipper (c. 1848–1903), journalist in South Australia, wrote as "Hugh Kalyptus"
Susan Skipper (born 1951), British actress
Svenn Skipper (born 1947), Danish composer
Tim Skipper, American vocalist and guitarist in the alternative rock band House of Heroes
Tuzar Skipper (born 1995), American football player
Wayde Skipper (born 1983), Australian rules footballer

See also
Ricardo Skippers (born 1986), South African footballer